Mill Creek Town Center is a lifestyle center in Mill Creek, Washington, United States. It is located along the Bothell-Everett Highway, and has 88 shops, restaurants, and other services.

History 
The town of Mill Creek was designed in the 1970s without a downtown, and the Mill Creek Town Center was created to give the town a commercial and social core. After the town adopted a comprehensive plan in 1992, citizens came together to develop plans for a town center, and construction began 10 years later. The complex opened in 2004.

References

External links

Shopping malls in Snohomish County, Washington
Shopping malls established in 2004